Casey Umstead (born 16 February 1996) is a field hockey player from the United States, who plays as a defender.

Personal life
Casey Umstead was born and raised in Green Lane, Pennsylvania.

She studied at the University of Connecticut.

Career
In 2018, Umstead made her debut for the United States during a test series against Belgium in Lancaster, Pennsylvania.

Umstead won her first medal with the national team in 2019, at the Pan American Games in Lima. During the tournament, Umstead scored her first international goal for the USA.

International goals

References

External links

1996 births
Living people
Female field hockey defenders
Pan American Games medalists in field hockey
American female field hockey players
Pan American Games bronze medalists for the United States
Field hockey players at the 2019 Pan American Games
Medalists at the 2019 Pan American Games
21st-century American women